Maylandia xanstomachus is a species of cichlid endemic to Lake Malawi where it is only known from the Maleri Islands and Kanjedza Island.  This species can reach a length of  TL.  It can also be found in the aquarium trade.

References

xanstomachus
Fish of Lake Malawi
Fish of Malawi
Fish described in 1989
Taxobox binomials not recognized by IUCN
Taxonomy articles created by Polbot